The 2018 BSWW Mundialito was a beach soccer tournament that took place at Costa da Caparica in Almada, Portugal, from 15 June to 17 June 2018. This competition with 4 teams was played in a round-robin format.

Participating nations

 (host)

Standings

Schedule and results

Winners

Awards

See also
Beach soccer
BSWW Mundialito
Euro Beach Soccer League

References

External links
Beach Soccer Worldwide

BSWW Mundialito
BSW
2018 in beach soccer